Diego Maurício Machado de Brito (born 25 June 1991), simply known as Diego Maurício, is a Brazilian professional footballer who plays as a striker for Indian Super League club Odisha.

Club career 
After working in the club's youth team with coach Rogério Lourenço for several years, in 2010 he got promoted to the professional team by the same coach. He debuted for Flamengo on May 23, 2010, in a 3–1 win against Grêmio Prudente, at Maracanã Stadium, as a substitute and suffered a penalty in the final minutes. It is considered a great promise of the club, a player with good physical size and skill, many fans compare Maurício to Didier Drogba, calling him Drogbinha, which means the Little Drogba.

Diego scored his first professional goal on July 21, 2010, in a 1–1 draw against Avaí, at Maracanã Stadium.

Flamengo's president, Patricia Amorim, declined a €6 million offer from Shaktar Donetsk for the player in May 2011.

On August 14, 2012 Russian club Alania Vladikavkaz signed Diego Maurício from Flamengo for €2,8 million. After A loan spell back at Brazil, he signed for top division Portuguese club Vitória F.C. in July 2014.

Before  2016 season opening, he joined to Ratchaburi F.C. in Thai Premier League, by trained with the club for about one month, but has moved away without cause.

Odisha 
On 31 August 2020, Indian Super League club Odisha signed Maurício ahead of the seventh edition of the Indian top-tier league, on a one-year deal.

On 23 November, Maurício made his debut for the club in the Indian Super League against Hyderabad, in a narrow 1–0 defeat. He scored a brace six days later, against Jamshedpur, which ended in a thrilling 2–2 draw. He grabbed the headlines in the second half, pulling one back in the 77th-minute before driving home a stunning injury-time equaliser.

He registered 12 goals along with two assists for the club. The forward was often the lone shining star in an otherwise below-par Juggernauts’ set-up. He finished third in the race for the Golden Boot, behind Goa's Igor Angulo and ATK Mohun Bagan's Roy Krishna.

Mumbai City 
On 21 January 2022, Indian Super League club Mumbai City announced the signing of Maurício as a replacement for Ygor Catatau, on a short-term deal.

On 3 February, Maurício made his debut for the club in the Indian Super League against ATK Mohun Bagan, in a 1–1 draw. He had a forgettable debut for the Islanders and was taken off for Igor Angulo, in the second half. On 17 February, he scored his first goal for the club, against Jamshedpur in a 3–2 defeat, through the penalty spot.

He was later included in the club's 2022 AFC Champions League squad. On 11 April, he scored the Islanders' first ever goal in the competition through the penalty spot, in a historic 2–1 win against Al-Quwa Al-Jawiya, as Mumbai City became the first Indian club to win a AFC Champions League game.

Odisha
In July 2022, Maurício returned to the Juggernauts after one year. On 17 August, he scored a free-kick on his return match in a 6–0 rout of NorthEast United in the Durand Cup.

Career statistics

Club

Honours

Club 
Flamengo
 Campeonato Carioca: 2011

International 
Brazil U-20
 South American Youth Championship: 2011

References

External links 
 
 
 Player profile @ Flapédia 
 

1991 births
Living people
Footballers from Rio de Janeiro (city)
Brazilian footballers
Brazil youth international footballers
Brazilian expatriate footballers
CR Flamengo footballers
FC Spartak Vladikavkaz players
Sport Club do Recife players
Al-Qadsiah FC players
Vitória F.C. players
Clube Atlético Bragantino players
Cangzhou Mighty Lions F.C. players
Gangwon FC players
Busan IPark players
Odisha FC players
Al-Shahania SC players
Mumbai City FC players
Russian Premier League players
Campeonato Brasileiro Série A players
Campeonato Brasileiro Série B players
Chinese Super League players
Saudi Professional League players
K League 1 players
K League 2 players
Indian Super League players
Qatari Second Division players
Expatriate footballers in Saudi Arabia
Expatriate footballers in Russia
Expatriate footballers in Portugal
Expatriate footballers in China
Expatriate footballers in South Korea
Expatriate footballers in India
Expatriate footballers in Qatar
Brazilian expatriate sportspeople in Saudi Arabia
Brazilian expatriate sportspeople in Russia
Brazilian expatriate sportspeople in China
Brazilian expatriate sportspeople in South Korea
Brazilian expatriate sportspeople in India
Brazilian expatriate sportspeople in Qatar
Association football forwards